Maracaiba zuliae is a species of skink, a lizard in the family Scincidae. The species is native to northwestern South America.

Etymology
The specific name, zuliae, refers to the Venezuelan state of Zulia.

Geographic range
M. zuliae is found in Venezuela and Colombia.

Habitat

Reproduction
The mode of reproduction of M. zuliae is unknown.

References

Further reading
Hedges SB, Conn CE (2012). "A new skink fauna from Caribbean islands (Squamata, Mabuyidae, Mabuyinae)". Zootaxa 3288: 1–244. (Maracaiba zuliae, new combination, p. 118).
Miralles A, Rivas G, Bonillo C, Schargel WE, Barros T, García-Pérez JE, Barrio-Amorós CL (2009). "Molecular systematics of Caribbean skinks of the genus Mabuya (Reptilia, Scincidae), with descriptions of two new species from Venezuela". Zoological Journal of the Linnean Society 156 (3): 598–616. (Mabuya zuliae, new species).

Maracaiba
Reptiles described in 2009
Taxa named by Aurélien Miralles
Taxa named by Gilson Rivas
Taxa named by Celine Bonillo
Taxa named by Walter E. Schargel
Taxa named by Tito Barros
Taxa named by Juan Elías García-Pérez
Taxa named by Cesar L. Barrio-Amoros